Harmeet is an Indian name .It may refer to

 Harmeet Desai, Indian table-tennis player
 Harmeet Dhillon, American lawyer and politician
 Harmeet Singh Baddhan, Indian cricketer
 Harmeet Singh Bansal, Indian cricketer
 Harmeet Singh (cricketer born 1987), Indian cricketer
 Harmeet Singh (cricketer born 1992), Indian cricketer
 Harmeet Singh (footballer) (born 1990), Norwegian footballer
 Harmeet Singh Kalka, Indian politician
 Harmeet Singh Sooden, activist
 Harmeet D. Walia, American inventor

Indian masculine given names